Senator Berg may refer to:

Charles A. Berg (1927–2014), Minnesota State Senate
Julius S. Berg (1893–1938), New York State Senate
Karen Berg (politician) (born 1961), Kentucky State Senate